Arno Steinwender (born 16 November 1976) is an Austrian board game designer and teacher. In his free time he develops board games, for which he has won several awards.

Career 
After graduating from the University of Vienna Steinwender began working as a teacher of mathematics and physics in school Komenský. He created the database get.to/spiele, which later grew into the website spieletest.at., which is now one of the largest information portals about games in the German speaking world. His first game, Venga-Venga!, was released by the publishing house Selecta Spielzeug. Steinwender creates about twenty game prototypes a year and is one of the most popular Austrian board game designers. He has interviews in newspapers and television broadcasts. He accepts contract work and one of his clients is the Austrian public transport organisation Wiener Linien.

Notable games 
 2003: Venga-Venga! (publishing house Selecta, co-author Ronald Hofstätter; award Spiel der Spiele: Hitgame for children 2004 (Austria))
 2004: Zappelfische (publishing house Ravensburger, co-author Ronald Hofstätter)
 2005: Kleiner Eisbär, auf in die Sonne! (publishing house Schmidt Spiele, co-author Christoph Puhl)
 2005: Pssst! (publishing house Piatnik, co-author Christoph Puhl)
 2006: Sternenschweif - Sprung in die Nacht (publishing house Kosmos, co-author Christoph Puhl)
 2006: Sheepworld - Schäfchen zählen (publishing house Ravensburger, co-author Andrea Steinhauser)
 2007: Seesternparty (publishing house Noris-Spiele, co-author Wilfried Lepuschitz)
 2007: Wurmsalat (publishing house Noris-Spiele, co-author Andrea Steinhauser)
 2007: Chut! Le petit dort (publishing house Piatnik, co-author Christoph Puhl)
 2007: Zug fährt ab! (publishing house Noris-Spiele, co-author Andrea Steinhauser)
 2008: Deukalion (publishing house Hasbro, co-author Wilfried Lepuschitz)
 2008: Europa-Wissen (publishing house Noris-Spiele, co-author Christoph Puhl)
 2008: Winnie the Poo - Kubuś w Stumilowym Lesie (publishing house Trefl, co-author Ronald Hofstätter, Christoph Puhl)
 2009: Europa-Wissen Deutschland (publishing house Noris, co-author Christoph Puhl)
 2009: Scooby Doo Help! (publishing house: Trefl, co-author Ronald Hofstätter, Christoph Puhl)
 2010: Take it or leave it (publishing house Schmidt Spiele, co-author Christoph Puhl)
 2011: Tohuwabohu – Berühmt berüchtigt (publishing house Ravensburger, co-authors Wilfried Lepuschitz, Ronald Hofstätter, Laura Di Centa)
 2011: Tohuwabohu – Einfach tierisch (publishing house Ravensburger, co-authors Wilfried Lepuschitz, Ronald Hofstätter, Laura Di Centa)
 2011: Wolf im Schafspelz (publishing house Huch! & friends, co-author Wilfried Lepuschitz)
 2011: Bahnbau Spiel B63 (co-author Ronald Hofstätter; for Wiener Linien, produced by White Castle Games)
 2011: Bremer Stadtmusikanten (publishing house Coppenrath Verlag, co-author Wilfried Lepuschitz)
 2012: Make'n'Break Party (publishing house Ravensburger, co-author Wilfried Lepuschitz)
 2012: Ratespaß auf Reisen (publishing house Ravensburger, co-author Ronald Hofstätter)
 2012: Barbar und die Abenteuer von Badou – Das Kartenspiel (publishing house Huch! & friends, co-author Wilfried Lepuschitz)
 2012: Take it or leave it (publishing house Gamewright Games, co-author Christoph Puhl; awarded with the Major Fun Award, Tillywig Brain Child Award and Parents' Choice Silver Honor ((USA))
 2012: Daj gryza! (publishing house Trefl, co-author Ronald Hofstätter)
 2013: Professor Tempus (publishing house Gigamic, Vertrieb: Asmodee, co-author Wilfried Lepuschitz)
 2014: Ganz Wien - mit Ubahn, Bus und Bim (for Wiener Linien, produced by White Castle Games)
 2014: Tom Turbo - Jagd auf Fritz Fantom (publishing house Piatnik, co-author Christoph Puhl; based on the TV series of the same name)
 2015: SOLOmino (publishing house Amigo, co-author Wilfried Lepuschitz)
 2015: Das Expedition Natur Spiel (publishing house moses., co-author Christoph Puhl)
 2015: Mount Pingo (publishing house Huch! & friends, co-author Christoph Puhl)
 2015: Wo ist bitte Umtata? (publishing house moses.)
 2016: Bataille de Polochons (publishing house Megableu, co-author Thomas Daum)
 2016: Fish Day (publishing house Zvezda)
 2017: Emoji Twist! (publishing house Ravensburger)
 2017: Das Spiel mit dem Essen (publishing house Piatnik)
 2017: Smart10 (publishing house Martinex, co-author Christoph Reiser; awarded Best Adult Game at the Årets vuxenspel 2017 (Sweden))
 2017: Das Rotkäppchen Duell (publishing house Carletto, co-author Christoph Reiser)
2018: #nosecrets (publishing house: moses., co-author: Markus Slawitscheck)
2018: (Come on) Let´s Quiz again (publishing house: moses.)
2018: Matschbirne (publishing house: Goliath Toys)
2018: Das Maß aller Dinge (publishing house: Gamefactory, co-author: Christoph Puhl)

References

External links 
 
 Arno Steinwenders reviewer website spieletest.at
 

1976 births
Living people
Austrian game designers
Board game designers